× Crataemespilus (or Cratae-mespilus) is the generic name applied to hybrids between the genera Crataegus and Mespilus. It should not be confused with + Crataegomespilus, which is applied to graft-chimeras between those genera.

Species
The species hybrids that are known are: 
 × Crataemespilus canescens (J.B.Phipps) J.B.Phipps
 × Crataemespilus gillotii E.G.Camus, hybrids between M. germanica and C. monogyna
 × Crataemespilus grandiflora (Sm.) E.G.Camus, hybrids between M. germanica and C. laevigata (originally named Mespilus grandiflora Sm.).

References

Maleae
Plant nothogenera
Rosaceae genera